Alan Prampin (born November 30, 1971) is a former U.S. soccer forward who spent one season in the Continental Indoor Soccer League, one in the USISL and four in Major League Soccer.  He also earned two caps with the U.S. national team.

College
Prampin attended Southern Methodist University where he played on the men's soccer team from 1990 to 1993.  He was selected as a third team All American in 1991, a first team All American in 1992 and second team in 1993. Prampin also started in each of the three games in the World University Games in Buffalo 1993 and also scored one goal. He was also an Olympic alternate for the U.S. Men's soccer team in 1992.

Professional career
Prampin played extensively with the U.S national B team in 1992 and 1993.  However, he turned professional with the Dallas Sidekicks of the Continental Indoor Soccer League in 1994.  He then spent the 1995 season with the Raleigh Flyers of USISL where he was named an offensive All-Star of the Atlantic Division.  In February 1996, the Kansas City Wiz of Major League Soccer selected Prampin in the tenth round (96th overall) of the Inaugural Player Draft.  On December 15, 1996, the Wiz traded Prampin and a third round supplemental draft pick to the Tampa Bay Mutiny for Steve Pittman.  Prampin led the team with  assists in 1998 and was named Tampa Bay Mutiny Honda Most Valuable Player and Tampa Bay Sports Club Most Valuable Player. He was named Tampa Bay Mutiny's Humanitarian of the Year for his work in the community. He remained with the Mutiny until he retired in 2000 due to injury.

National team
Prampin earned two caps with the U.S. national team.  His first was a 2–2 tie with El Salvador on March 23, 1993, when he came on for Cobi Jones in the 89th minute.  His second game was two days later, a  4–1 loss to Honduras.  He again came on for Cobi Jones, this time in the 83rd minute.

External links
 Dallas Sidekicks profile

1971 births
Living people
Soccer players from Dallas
All-American men's college soccer players
United States men's international soccer players
Dallas Sidekicks (CISL) players
USISL players
Raleigh Flyers players
Sporting Kansas City players
Tampa Bay Mutiny players
SMU Mustangs men's soccer players
Major League Soccer players
American soccer players
Association football forwards